Trichonephila clavata, also known as the , is a member of the Trichonephila genus. The spider can be found throughout Japan (except Hokkaidō), Korea, Taiwan, China, and since 2020, much of northeastern Georgia and northwestern South Carolina in the United States. Due to its large size and the bright, unique colors of the female Trichonephila, the spider is well-favored in Japan.

In 2014, scientists confirmed the first known occurrence of T. clavata in North America.

In 2019, this species was moved from the genus Nephila to Trichonephila. T. clavata'''s congener Trichonephila plumipes is commonly found in Australia. It also was moved from Nephila to Trichonephila, along with 10 other species.

CharacteristicsTrichonephila clavata pass winter as eggs and scatter as tiny juveniles in the spring. The adult female's body size is 17–25 mm, while the male's is  7–10 mm.

The web of females may reach several meters in length. In sunlight, the yellow threads appear to be a rich gold color. The structure of the web seen in cross-section is unusual for an orb web; it has three layers: the central orb, plus two irregular layers in front and behind the orb.

The adult female individual has stripes of yellow and dark blue, with red toward the rear of the abdomen. In autumn, smaller males may be seen in the webs of the females for copulating. After mating, the female spins an egg sack on a tree, laying 400 to 1500 eggs in one sack. Her lifecycle ends by late autumn or early winter with the death of the spider. The next generation emerges in spring. 

Although the spider is not aggressive, they will bite to protect themselves. The bite is considered painful, but not life-threatening.

Silk strength and applications
Researchers led by Masao Nakagaki at Shinshu University, Japan, have succeeded in creating a silk thread that is stronger, softer, and more durable than conventional silk by injecting silkworm eggs with genes of the Jorō spider. The silkworms that hatch weave cocoons containing 10% spider protein. The dragline silk is said to have many uses, such as for bulletproof vests, sutures after an operation, fishing line, nets, and tennis rackets. A Japanese manufacturer, Okamoto, began developing commercial applications for the silk and planned to release extra-thin, durable spider socks by 2010.

In folklore
Jorōgumo is a legendary creature in Japanese folklore. A Jorōgumo is a spider who can change her appearance into that of a beautiful woman. She's said to breathe fire and to be able to control other spiders. She seeks men to seduce, whom she then binds in her silk and devours.

Introduced species in North America
The spider is an introduced species in northeast Georgia and northwest / upstate South Carolina in North America. They were first spotted in Hoschton, Georgia in 2013. Since then, they have been spotted in numerous locations in northeast Georgia, including the Athens, Georgia area, and also in Greenville, South Carolina. It is believed that the species will become naturalized. They are expected to colonize much of the Eastern Seaboard of the United States due to their relative imperviousness to the cold. 

As of 2022, their impact on their new ecosystem is unknown. They have been observed catching the brown marmorated stink bug (Halymorpha halys), an invasive species that native spiders have not been known to eat, and it has also been hoped that they may consume mosquitoes and flies. Some hope that the impact of the species will be positive due to their harmless nature and consumption of primarily invasive or nuisance insects; however, because of the relative lack of information about its ecology, the effects the spider will have on ecosystems are unknown.Aridi, Rasha, ‘Like a Scene Out of ‘Arachnophobia,” Invasive Spiders Take Over Northern Georgia - Scientists are torn on whether the Joro spider could have positive or negative effects on the native ecosystem, Smithsonian, November 9, 2021

Gallery

 See also 
 Joro toxin
 Tegenaria parietina''

References

External links 

 Big Yellow Spiders in South Carolina Home and Garden Information Center, Clemson University 

Araneidae
Spiders of Asia
Articles containing video clips
Spiders described in 1878
Taxa named by Ludwig Carl Christian Koch